Charles James David Fox  (March 24, 1941 – November 13, 2021), known professionally as David Fox, was a Canadian actor.

Biography 
Fox was born in Swastika, Ontario in 1941. He was best known for his role as schoolteacher Clive Pettibone in Road to Avonlea, and for a variety of roles on television. He was also the voice of Captain Haddock in The Adventures of Tintin.

In 1996 he was nominated for a Genie Award for the film When Night is Falling, and in 2008 he was nominated for a Gemini Award for the television miniseries Across the River to Motor City.

Fox also acted extensively on stage, including productions of 1837: The Farmer's Revolt, Quiet in the Land, Nothing Sacred, The Drawer Boy and King Lear. He was made a Member of the Order of Canada in 2018 for his work.

Fox died of cancer in Toronto  on November 13, 2021, at the age of 80.

Filmography

Film

Television

References

External links 
 

1941 births
2021 deaths
Canadian male television actors
Dora Mavor Moore Award winners
Male actors from Ontario
Members of the Order of Canada
Canadian male stage actors
Canadian male film actors
Canadian male voice actors
People from Kirkland Lake
Canadian male Shakespearean actors